is a former Japanese football player.

Playing career
Sada was born in Maebashi on March 18, 1984. After graduating from high school, Sada joined J1 League club Sanfrecce Hiroshima in 2002. Sanfrecce was relegated to J2 League from 2003 season. In 2004, he moved to Japan Football League (JFL) club Thespa Kusatsu, where he played as a defensive right back. Thespa was promoted to J2 from 2005. Shortly afterwards, Sada became a more frequent player. His opportunity to play decreased from summer 2010. In 2012, Sada moved to JFL club AC Nagano Parceiro. He retired at the end of the 2012 season.

Club statistics

References

External links

1984 births
Living people
Association football people from Gunma Prefecture
Japanese footballers
J1 League players
J2 League players
Japan Football League players
Sanfrecce Hiroshima players
Thespakusatsu Gunma players
AC Nagano Parceiro players
Association football defenders